The 1920 United States Senate election in Vermont took place on November 2, 1920. Incumbent Republican William P. Dillingham successfully ran for re-election to another term in the United States Senate, defeating Democratic candidate Howard E. Shaw. Dillingham died in July 1923, vacating the seat until a special election could be held in November 1923.

Republican primary

Results

Democratic primary

Results

General election

Results

References

Vermont
1920
1920 Vermont elections